Helga Pilarczyk (12 March 1925 – 15 September 2011) was a German operatic soprano.

However, she made her debut as a contralto at the Staatstheater Braunschweig, as Irmentraud in Lortzing's Der Waffenschmied in 1951. By 1954 to 1955, she emerged as a dramatic soprano at the Hamburg State Opera, where she remained until the 1966/67 season.

She appeared in Zürich, Berlin, at the Royal Opera House, Covent Garden (as Salome in 1958), Florence ( and Wozzeck), the Glyndebourne Festival (as Composer in Ariadne auf Naxos by Strauss, 1958), Paris Opéra (Wozzeck, 1963, and Von heute auf morgen, 1967), La Scala (Lulu, then The Flood, both in 1963), and Vienna.

In 1965, she debuted both at the Metropolitan Opera (Wozzeck, under Karl Böhm) and in Chicago (Wozzeck, with Sir Geraint Evans, under Bruno Bartoletti).

Opera Depot has issued her 1963 performance of Puccini's Il tabarro, conducted by Alberto Erede, on Compact Disc.

The  died, following a brief illness, in Hamburg, at the age of eighty-six, leaving behind two children. Helga Pilarczyk is buried in Hamburg.

References 
 The Metropolitan Opera Encyclopedia, edited by David Hamilton, Simon & Schuster, 1987.

External links 
  Helge Pilarczyk in an excerpt from Lulu.

1925 births
2011 deaths
People from Helmstedt (district)
German operatic sopranos
Academic staff of the Hochschule für Musik und Theater Hamburg
20th-century German women  opera singers